Boon Xin Yuan (born 27 February 1999) is a Malaysian badminton player. He is affiliated with the Serdang Badminton Club opened by Ong Ewe Hock.

Career 
In his junior days, he partnered with Chang Yee Jun and competed in the Badminton Asia Junior Championships. He later partnered with Yap Qar Siong. They won the Mauritius International and reached the quarterfinals of the Myanmar International in 2019.

Having trouble forming successful partnerships, Boon partnered up with Wong Tien Ci, who is also one of the players playing for Serdang BC. They reached the semifinals of the Welsh International in 2021 after a hard fought battle with Korean veterans Kim Gi-jung and Kim Sa-rang.

In early 2022, they won two consecutive titles at the Uganda International and the Slovak Open respectively. These titles boosted their rankings and earned them a place in bigger tournaments. They continue their fine run as they would go onto achieving a semifinals finish at the Taipei Open after losing to Olympic champions Lee Yang and Wang Chi-lin.

Achievements

BWF International Challenge/Series (3 titles) 
Men's doubles

  BWF International Challenge tournament
  BWF International Series tournament
  BWF Future Series tournament

References

External links 
 
 

1999 births
Living people
People from Malacca
Malaysian sportspeople of Chinese descent
Malaysian male badminton players
20th-century Malaysian people
21st-century Malaysian people